The Real Cancun is a 2003 American reality film directed by Rick de Oliveira and written by Brian Caldirola. Inspired by the reality television genre, this film followed the lives of sixteen Americans from March 13–23, 2003 as they celebrated spring break in Cancún, Mexico and experienced romantic relationships, emotional strife, or just had a good time.

The film received negative critical reviews and was a box office flop, earning a little over $5 million in the United States from a $7.5 million budget. It was the film debut of Laura Ramsey.

Cast

 Benjamin "Fletch" Fletcher 
 Nicole Frilot 
 Roxanne Frilot
 David Ingber 
 Jeremy Jazwinski
 Amber Madison 
 Paul Malbry 
 Marquita "Skye" Marshall aka Skye P Marshall 
 Laura Ramsey
 Matthew Slenske
 Alan Taylor 
 Heidi Vance 
 Casey Weeks
 Sarah Wilkins
 Jorell Washington
 Adam Miller
 Grant George as Miscellaneous voices
 Hot Action Cop
 Simple Plan
 Snoop Dogg

Release 
The Real Cancun was released theatrically only a month after filming was completed, and was released on DVD and home video only a couple of months after that.

Box office 
The film earned $2,108,796 in its opening weekend from 2,261 venues, ranking tenth in the North American box office and fourth among the week's new releases. It closed a month later, having grossed $3,825,421 domestically and $1,519,662 overseas for a worldwide total of $5,345,083, coming well short of its $7.5 million production cost.

Critical response 
The Real Cancun received generally negative reviews from critics (with Variety'''s Scott Foundas causing to remark in his review that The Real Cancun billed itself as "the first reality feature film" is "apparently ignoring last year's Jackass: The Movie"). On review aggregator website Rotten Tomatoes, the film holds a 35% score based on 88 reviews, with an average rating of 4.2/10. The site's consensus states: "The footage is predictable and rather tame, and most of the people are uninteresting." Metacritic reports a 34 out of 100 rating based on 24 critics, indicating "generally unfavorable reviews". Audiences polled by CinemaScore gave the film an average grade of "C−" on an A+ to F scale.

 Awards and nominations 
The film was nominated for Worst Picture and Worst Excuse for an Actual Movie (All Concept/No Content) at the 24th Golden Raspberry Awards. It lost both awards to Gigli for the former and The Cat in the Hat for the latter.- 2004 Razzies - CBS News

 Thematic analysis 
Carol Siegel, a professor of English and American Studies at Washington State University Vancouver, interpreted The Real Cancun as about society's expectations of juveniles' sexual behaviors; despite visuals such as near nudity and simulations of the act, the characters try to present themselves as being abstinent and not "slut"-ty, and only two couples make love by the end.

 Aftermath 
A reality movie based upon the Girls Gone Wild video series that MGM bought the rights to was never put into production, while the Universal Pictures effort Drunken Jackasses: The Quest was delayed after the flop of Cancun'' and ultimately went straight to video.

References

External links
 
 
 
 
 Trailer

2003 films
2003 documentary films
American documentary films
Cancún
Films about spring break
Films shot in Mexico
New Line Cinema films
Films scored by Michael Suby
2000s English-language films
2000s American films